Branchburg is a township in Somerset County, New Jersey.  As of the 2010 United States Census, the township's population was 14,459, reflecting a decline of 107 (−0.7%) from the 14,566 counted in the 2000 Census, which had in turn increased by 3,678 (+33.8%) from the 10,888 counted in the 1990 Census.

While the area of today's Branchburg has a history antedating the American Revolutionary War, the township itself was incorporated by an act of the New Jersey Legislature on April 5, 1845, from portions of Bridgewater Township. The township is named for its location at a point where branches of the Raritan River merge.

History 
The land that is now known as Branchburg Township was originally inhabited by the Raritans, a tribe of the Lenni Lenape Native Americans.  By 1686 most of the land was purchased from the Lenape by the Lords Proprietors of East Jersey, who sold the land in small parcels to numerous settlers, mostly of Dutch or English extraction. With the 1688 redrawing of the boundary between East and West Jersey, the Branchburg region was split between Essex County to the north and the newly formed Somerset County to the south. With Somerset's acquisition of territory from Essex and Middlesex Counties in 1741, Branchburg lay entirely within Somerset County.

Bridgewater Township was chartered in 1749. The residents of the part of Bridgewater west of the Raritan River petitioned the New Jersey Legislature for incorporation as a separate township, which was granted by an act dated April 5, 1845. The first town meeting was held April 14, 1845, in White Oak Tavern, a stagecoach stop and local meeting place along the Old York Road.

Geography
According to the United States Census Bureau, the township had a total area of 20.30 square miles (52.58 km2), including 20.07 square miles (51.98 km2) of land and 0.23 square miles (0.6 km2) of water (1.14%).

Unincorporated communities, localities and place names located partially or completely within the township include Burnt Mill, Centerville, Fox Hollow, Neshanic, Neshanic Station (ZIP Code 08853) and North Branch (ZIP Code 08876), North Branch Depot and Woodfern.

The township is bordered on the west by Readington Township in Hunterdon County; on the north by Bedminster Township and on the south by Bridgewater Township and Hillsborough Township.

The main watercourses are the Lamington River on the north, the North Branch of the Raritan River on the east and the South Branch of the Raritan River on the east and south. These rivers along with small streams and brooks are excellent for fishermen who enjoy trout stocked streams and rivers. Branchburg is in the Raritan Valley, a line of cities in Central New Jersey. Branchburg lies in the western division of the Raritan Valley along with Bridgewater and Raritan.

Demographics

Census 2010

The Census Bureau's 2006–2010 American Community Survey showed that (in 2010 inflation-adjusted dollars) median household income was $119,092 (with a margin of error of +/− $7,934) and the median family income was $136,310 (+/− $12,919). Males had a median income of $97,359 (+/− $7,041) versus $61,192 (+/− $8,826) for females. The per capita income for the borough was $51,387 (+/− $2,945). About 1.5% of families and 1.3% of the population were below the poverty line, including 0.5% of those under age 18 and 5.3% of those age 65 or over.

Census 2000

As of the 2000 United States Census there were 14,566 people, 5,272 households, and 4,064 families residing in the township. The population density was 719.1 people per square mile (277.6/km2). There were 5,405 housing units with an average density of 266.8 per square mile (103.0/km2). The racial makeup of the township was 90.44% White, 1.95% African American, 0.10% Native American, 6.17% Asian, 0.03% Pacific Islander, 0.39% from other races, and 0.92% from two or more races. Hispanic or Latino of any race were 2.69% of the population.

There were 5,272 households, out of which 39.7% had children under the age of 18 living with them, 69.6% were married couples living together, 5.5% had a female householder with no husband present, and 22.9% were non-families. 18.8% of all households were made up of individuals, and 5.0% had someone living alone who was 65 years of age or older.  The average household size was 2.76 and the average family size was 3.19.

In the township the population was spread out, with 27.3% under the age of 18, 4.5% from 18 to 24, 34.6% from 25 to 44, 25.3% from 45 to 64 and 8.3% who were 65 years of age or older. The median age was 38 years. For every 100 females, there were 96.4 males. For every 100 females age 18 and over, there were 93.2 males.

The median income for a household in the township was $96,864, and the median income for a family was $110,268. Males had a median income of $70,726 versus $47,786 for females. The per capita income for the township was $41,241. About 1.1% of families and 1.9% of the population were living below the poverty line, including 1.4% of those under age 18 and 5.0% of those age 65 or over.

Economy
Branchburg Township is the home to the 31 Tannery Project which serves as the corporate headquarters for Ferreira Construction, the Ferreira Group, and Noveda Technologies. The  office and shop building was constructed in 2006. It was the first building in the state of New Jersey to meet New Jersey's Executive Order 54 and the first net zero electric commercial building in the United States.

Sports
Branchburg is home to the 2012 14U Babe Ruth World Series Championship baseball team, the first from the state since 1989. The underdog Bulldogs, consisting of players drawn from a tryout pool totaling 16 players, competed and won against teams drawn from tryout pools as large as 500 players.

Government

Local government 
Branchburg Township operates under the Township form of New Jersey municipal government, one of 141 municipalities (of the 564) statewide that use this form, the second-most commonly used form of government in the state. The Township Committee is comprised of five members, who are elected directly by the voters at-large in partisan elections to serve three-year terms of office on a staggered basis, with either one or two seats coming up for election each year as part of the November general election in a three-year cycle. The township has been governed by a five-member Township Council since the 1971 elections, when the population surpassed 4,000 in the 1970 United States Census, mandating an expansion from the three-member committee that had been in place until then. A mayor and deputy mayor are selected from among the council from among its members at an annual reorganization meeting.

, members of the Township Committee are Mayor James G. Schworn (Republican Party, term on committee ends December 31, 2023; term as mayor ends 2022), Deputy Mayor David Owens (R, term on committee and as deputy mayor ends 2022), Brendon Beatrice (R, 2024), Anna P. Columbus (R, 2024) and Thomas L. Young (R, 2022).

In January 2020, the Township Committee chose David Owens from a list of three candidates nominated by the Republican municipal committee to fill the vacant seat expiring in December 2022 that had been held by Robert Petrelli until he resigned immediately after his new three-year term started.

In July 2015, Patricia Rees resigned from office, citing her employment by the nonpartisan New Jersey School Board Association.

Federal, state and county representation 
Branchburg Township is located in the 7th Congressional District and is part of New Jersey's 16th state legislative district.

 

Somerset County is governed by a five-member Board of County Commissioners, whose members are elected at-large to three-year terms of office on a staggered basis, with one or two seats coming up for election each year. At an annual reorganization meeting held on the first Friday of January, the board selects a Director and Deputy Director from among its members. , Somerset County's County Commissioners are
Director Shanel Robinson (D, Franklin Township, term as commissioner ends December 31, 2024; term as director ends 2022),
Deputy Director Melonie Marano (D, Green Brook Township, term as commissioner and as deputy director ends 2022),
Paul Drake (D, Hillsborough Township, 2023),
Douglas Singleterry (D, North Plainfield, 2023) and 
Sara Sooy (D, Basking Ridge in Bernards Township, 2024).
Pursuant to Article VII Section II of the New Jersey State Constitution, each county in New Jersey is required to have three elected administrative officials known as constitutional officers. These officers are the County Clerk and County Surrogate (both elected for five-year terms of office) and the County Sheriff (elected for a three-year term). Constitutional officers, elected on a countywide basis are 
County Clerk Steve Peter (D, Somerville, 2022),
Sheriff Darrin Russo (D, Franklin Township, 2022) and 
Surrogate Bernice "Tina" Jalloh (D, Franklin Township, 2025)

Politics

As of March 23, 2011, there were a total of 9,970 registered voters in Branchburg Township, of which 1,832 (18.4% vs. 26.0% countywide) were registered as Democrats, 3,650 (36.6% vs. 25.7%) were registered as Republicans and 4,484 (45.0% vs. 48.2%) were registered as Unaffiliated. There were 4 voters registered as Libertarians or Greens. Among the township's 2010 Census population, 69.0% (vs. 60.4% in Somerset County) were registered to vote, including 93.2% of those ages 18 and over (vs. 80.4% countywide).

In the 2012 presidential election, Republican Mitt Romney received 60.2% of the vote (4,537 cast), ahead of Democrat Barack Obama with 38.5% (2,902 votes), and other candidates with 1.2% (92 votes), among the 7,568 ballots cast by the township's 10,499 registered voters (37 ballots were spoiled), for a turnout of 72.1%. In the 2008 presidential election, Republican John McCain received 4,651 votes (58.5% vs. 46.1% countywide), ahead of Democrat Barack Obama with 3,172 votes (39.9% vs. 52.1%) and other candidates with 92 votes (1.2% vs. 1.1%), among the 7,956 ballots cast by the township's 9,643 registered voters, for a turnout of 82.5% (vs. 78.7% in Somerset County). In the 2004 presidential election, Republican George W. Bush received 4,706 votes (61.6% vs. 51.5% countywide), ahead of Democrat John Kerry with 2,835 votes (37.1% vs. 47.2%) and other candidates with 79 votes (1.0% vs. 0.9%), among the 7,639 ballots cast by the township's 9,087 registered voters, for a turnout of 84.1% (vs. 81.7% in the whole county).

In the 2013 gubernatorial election, Republican Chris Christie received 77.1% of the vote (3,651 cast), ahead of Democrat Barbara Buono with 21.3% (1,010 votes), and other candidates with 1.6% (77 votes), among the 4,804 ballots cast by the township's 10,612 registered voters (66 ballots were spoiled), for a turnout of 45.3%. In the 2009 gubernatorial election, Republican Chris Christie received 3,945 votes (69.1% vs. 55.8% countywide), ahead of Democrat Jon Corzine with 1,266 votes (22.2% vs. 34.1%), Independent Chris Daggett with 445 votes (7.8% vs. 8.7%) and other candidates with 27 votes (0.5% vs. 0.7%), among the 5,706 ballots cast by the township's 9,777 registered voters, yielding a 58.4% turnout (vs. 52.5% in the county).

Emergency services
Branchburg Township is served by three major Emergency Services; a full-time Police Department, an all-volunteer Emergency Medical & Rescue Services Squad, and four all-volunteer Fire Departments.

Police 
The Branchburg Police Department, under the direction of Chief David Young, was established on June 16, 1980. The Department currently has 26 full-time sworn officers, two civilian employees, seven crossing guards, and 13 Emergency Management volunteers. The Department has specialized units of officers who have taken on duties in addition to their patrol or detective work. These include the Detective Bureau, Juvenile Officer, School Resources, Traffic Safety, Community Policing, Services, Bike Patrol, First-Aid, Explorers program and Emergency Management.

On January 26, 2010, a clerk at the Quick Chek store at 1296 Easton Turnpike in Branchburg called officers about a suspicious person in the store.  Officers arrested Lloyd Woodson, and found in his possession and in his motel room a large weapons cache that included illegal weapons and ammunition, a detailed map of Fort Drum, and a traditional red-and-white Middle Eastern headdress.  He was charged on multiple state and federal weapons charges. The three officers who responded to the call received an Exceptional Duty Award for their actions.

EMS and rescue squad 
Emergency Medical Services and Rescue Services are provided throughout the Township by the Branchburg Rescue Squad, which was formed in October 1955 and continues to serve the residents and businesses on an all-volunteer basis.  As of 2013, officers include President Carol Waechter and Chief Matt Hoffman.  The Branchburg volunteers rely solely on donations received from the community.  Services provided include Basic Life Support, Emergency Medical Services (BLS/EMS), NFPA Technician Level: Vehicle Extrication, Water Rescue, Confined Space, Rope Rescue, High Angle Rescue NFPA Operations Level: Ice Rescue NFPA Awareness Level: Trench Collapse, Building & Structural Collapse.  Operating out of Station 74 Rescue at 113 River Road are three BLS Ambulances, a Heavy Rescue Services Unit, one Rescue Services Unit, one First Responder/Command Unit and two inflatable rescue boats.

Fire departments 
The Township of Branchburg is covered by four volunteer fire departments: 
North Branch Volunteer Fire Company in the north, 
Readington Volunteer Fire Company to the west,  
Neshanic Volunteer Fire Department on the south and 
Country Hills Volunteer Fire Company covering the central portion of the township.

Education 

The Branchburg Township School District serves public school students in pre-kindergarten through eighth grade. As of the 2020–2021 school year, the district, comprised of three schools, had an enrollment of 1,325 students and 152.7 classroom teachers (on an FTE basis), for a student–teacher ratio of 8.7:1. Schools in the district (with 2020–2021 enrollment data from the National Center for Education Statistics) are 
Whiton Elementary School with 544 students in grades Pre-K–3, 
Stony Brook School with 287 students in grades 4–5 and 
Branchburg Central Middle School with 486 students in grades 6–8.

The public secondary school serving Branchburg for ninth through twelfth grades is Somerville High School, which students attend as part of a sending/receiving relationship with the Somerville Public Schools. As of the 2020–2021 school year, the high school had an enrollment of 1,155 students and 92.0 classroom teachers (on an FTE basis), for a student–teacher ratio of 12.6:1.

Midland School is a non-profit special education school serving the individual social, emotional, academic and career needs of children with developmental disabilities.  The school serves 245 students, ranging in age from 5 to 21 years old, from central and northern New Jersey.

Branchburg Township is the home of the main campus of Raritan Valley Community College.

Transportation

Roads and highways

Branchburg Township is centrally located with access to major roadways and highways.  U.S. Route 202 and U.S. Route 22 travel through the township with easy passage to Interstate 78, Interstate 287 and Route 206, enabling residents to travel to New York City and Philadelphia within one hour.

Rail and Public transportation
NJ Transit train service between Branchburg and New York City is available on the Raritan Valley Line at the North Branch station (located on Station Road), which offers limited daily service and no weekend trains. The Raritan Valley Line has weekly service from North Branch Station to Newark Penn Station, where connections can be made to Pennsylvania Station in Midtown Manhattan.

The Norfolk Southern Railway's Lehigh Line (formerly the mainline of the Lehigh Valley Railroad), runs through Branchburg.

NJ Transit offers bus service to and from Newark on the 65 line with local service on the 884 route.

Trans-Bridge Lines offers bus service between New Hope, Pennsylvania and New York City, with a stop at the Municipal Park-and-Ride facility on Route 202 North on a daily basis, with westbound service on the Doylestown route to Bethlehem, Pennsylvania and eastbound to Newark Liberty International Airport and the Port Authority Bus Terminal in Midtown Manhattan.

Transport of New Jersey bus service between New York City and Allentown, Pennsylvania is available on a daily basis.

Also within driving distance are Lehigh Valley International Airport (ABE, formerly Allentown-Bethlehem-Easton International Airport) near Allentown, Pennsylvania, John F. Kennedy International Airport and La Guardia Airport in New York, as well as the Trenton-Mercer Airport near Trenton and Princeton in Mercer County.

Points of interest 
The South Branch Schoolhouse, located on South Branch Road, is a one-room schoolhouse built in 1873, the last one-room school house in use in the county. Its purpose was to educate children in grades 1–8 from Branchburg and Hillsborough townships. It was closed in 1965. In 2007 the schoolhouse was renovated to add the bell tower back onto the top of the building. Also known as the Little Red Schoolhouse, it is now owned by the township of Branchburg. Notable students at the Little Red Schoolhouse include opera star and Edison protégé Anna Case and Marion Van Fleet, the mother of actor Lee Van Cleef. It was added to the National Register of Historic Places in 2005 for its significance in architecture and education.

The Neshanic Station Historic District was added to the NRHP in 2016 for its significance in community development. It includes the Neshanic Station Lenticular Truss Bridge crossing the South Branch Raritan River.

Notable people

People who were born in, residents of, or otherwise closely associated with Branchburg include:

 Christopher Bateman (born 1957), member of the New Jersey Senate representing the 16th Legislative District, who served as mayor of Branchburg in 1986
 Raymond Bateman (1927–2016), politician, who represented Somerset County in the New Jersey Senate in the 1960s and 1970s and was the Republican candidate for Governor of New Jersey in 1977
 Frank Chapot (1932–2016), Olympic silver medalist equestrian
 Jeffrey Chiesa (born 1965), New Jersey Attorney General who was named to the United States Senate to fill Frank Lautenberg's vacant seat on an interim basis from June 2013 until the October 2013 special election, when Cory Booker took office
 Robert Cox (1813–1890), politician who served in the Michigan House of Representatives
 Denise Coyle (born 1953), member of the New Jersey General Assembly from 2008 to 2012 who served as mayor of Branchburg in 1993
 Anthony Gargiulo (born 1984), defensive end who played in the Canadian Football League for the Calgary Stampeders
 Bob Masterson (1915–1994), American football end who played in the National Football League for the Washington Redskins
 Brendan O'Hare, comedian known for his absurdist humor and podcast, This Is Branchburg

References

External links 

Branchburg Township official web site

 
1845 establishments in New Jersey
Populated places established in 1845
Township form of New Jersey government
Townships in Somerset County, New Jersey